This article lists the chapters of Sigma Chi Fraternity by state or province. Within each state or province, the chapters are listed by Greek letter.

See List of Sigma Chi alumni chapters for alumni chapters.

Undergraduate Chapters in the United States

Alabama
  Samford University (Originally Howard College) (1872-1885) (1984–Present) 
 Auburn University (1934–2013) (2017–Present)
 University of South Alabama (1970–Present)
 University of North Alabama (1974–Present)
 Troy University (1977–Present)
 University of Alabama (1876-1877), (1914–Present)
 Birmingham-Southern College (1879-1882) (1993–Present) (Originally Southern University)
 Spring Hill College (1984-2006), (2009–Present)

Arizona
 University of Arizona (1921-1972) (1977-2003) (2009–present)
 Arizona State University (1960–2021)
 Northern Arizona University (1967–Present)
 Embry-Riddle Aeronautical University (2005–Present)

Arkansas
 Arkansas State University (1987–Present)
 University of Arkansas (1905–Present)

California
 University of California, Berkeley (1886-1968) (1972–Present)
 University of Southern California (1889-1994) (2000–Present)
 Stanford University (1891-1965), (1966-1967) (1974–2018)
 University of California, Los Angeles (1947–Present)
 San Diego State University (1949–2013) (2020–Present)
 California State University, Fresno (1952–Present)
 San Jose State University (1952–Present)
 University of California, Santa Barbara (1965-2007) (2017–Present)
 California State University, Northridge (1966–2020)
 California State University, Long Beach (1970-1998) (2013–Present) 
 University of California, Irvine (1975-1995) (2003–Present)
 University of San Diego (1984-2004)
 California State University, Sacramento (1985–2015)
 University of California, Davis (1985–Present)
 California State Polytechnic University, Pomona (1985–Present)
 California Polytechnic State University (1986-2002)
 California State University, San Bernardino (1987–Present)
 University of California, San Diego (1990–Present)
 Loyola Marymount University (1991–Present)
 University of the Pacific  (2003–Present)
 California State University, Chico (Disaffiliated from campus in 2013) (1992–Present)
 Pepperdine University (1998–Present)
 Santa Clara University (2008–Present)
 University of California, Merced (2009–Present)
 California State University, San Marcos (2015–Present)

Colorado
 Colorado College (1905–Present)
 University of Colorado at Boulder (1914-1971) (1981–Present)
 Colorado State University (1919–2020)
 University of Denver (1947–Present)
 University of Northern Colorado (1958–2018)

Connecticut
 Wesleyan University (1928-1959)
 University of Connecticut (1943-1951) (1971–Present)
 Yale University (1986–Present)
 Western Connecticut State University (1988–Present)
ΛΕ  University of New Haven (2009–Present)

Delaware
 University of Delaware (1992-2012, 2020–Present)

District of Columbia
 The George Washington University (1864-1887) (1892-1972) (1973-2000) (2007–Present)
 American University (2000–Present)
 Georgetown University (2019–Present)

Florida
 University of Florida (1924–Present)
 University of Miami (1942–Present)
 Florida State University (1951–2014)(2021–Present)
 Florida Southern College (1959–Present)
 Embry-Riddle Aeronautical University (1971–Present) 
 University of Central Florida (1974–Present) 
 University of South Florida (1979–Present)
 Jacksonville University (1988–Present)
 University of North Florida (1991–Present)
 The University of Tampa (2007–Present)
 University of West Florida (2008–2020)
 Florida Gulf Coast University (2010–Present)
 Florida International University (2011–Present) 
 Florida Atlantic University  (2013–present)

Georgia
 University of Georgia (1872-1887) (1910-1990) (1996–Present)
 Emory University (1921–Present)
 Georgia Institute of Technology (1922–Present)
 Georgia Southern University (1970–Present)
 Georgia Southwestern State University (1970–Present)
 North Georgia College and State University (1982–Present)
 Valdosta State University (2011–Present)
 University of West Georgia (2013–Present)

Idaho
 University of Idaho (1924–Present)
 College of Idaho (1994–Present)
 Boise State University (2012–Present)

Illinois
 Northwestern University (1869-2000) (2005–Present)
 Illinois Wesleyan University (1883–Present)
 Bradley University (1949–Present)
 Monmouth College (1874-1878)
 Eastern Illinois University (1971–2017)
 Northern Illinois University (1972-2000)
 Illinois State University (1985–2015) (2022–Present)
 Western Illinois University (1989–Present)
 University of Illinois at Urbana-Champaign (1881-1884) (1892–Present)
 University of Chicago (1897-1952) (2011–Present)
 Knox College (2007–Present)
 Loyola University Chicago (2012–Present)
 Southern Illinois University-Carbondale (2012–Present)
 DePaul University (2015–Present)

Indiana
 Indiana University (1858–Present)
 DePauw University (1859–Present)
 Butler University (1865–Present)
 Hanover College (1871-1917) (1936–Present)
 Purdue University (1875–Present)
 Wabash College (1880-1894) (1909–Present)
 Ball State University (1962–Present)
 Indiana State University (1985–2018)
 Valparaiso University  (1990–Present)

Iowa
 University of Iowa (1882-1889) (1902-1991) (2000–Present)
 Iowa State University (1916–2018)
 Drake University (1980–Present)

Kansas
 University of Kansas (1885–Present)
 Kansas State University (1949–Present)
 Pittsburg State University (1964–Present)
 Fort Hays State University (1967–Present)

Kentucky
 Murray State University (1959–Present)
 Western Kentucky University (1965–Present)
 Centre College (1875–Present)
 Eastern Kentucky University (1970–Present)
 University of Louisville (1989–Present)
 University of Kentucky (1893–Present)

Louisiana
 Tulane University, originally  at University of Louisiana (1882-1883) (1886–Present)
 Louisiana State University (1925–2015) (2019–Present)
 University of Louisiana at Lafayette (2014–Present)

Maine
 University of Maine (1902–Present)

Maryland
 University of Maryland, College Park (1942-2002) (2009–Present)
 Towson University (2000-2011) (2021–Present)
 Johns Hopkins University (2004–Present)

Massachusetts

ΑΘ Massachusetts Institute of Technology (1882–Present)
 Bridgewater State College (1983–Present)
 Boston University (1990–2015)
 Harvard University (1992–Present)
 Bentley University (2013–Present)
ME University of Massachusetts, Amherst (2017–Present)

Michigan
 Hillsdale College (1883-1886) (1980–Present)
 Albion College (1886-1977) (1980–Present)
 Michigan State University (1942–2017) 
 Kettering University (1963–Present)
 Western Michigan University (1966–Present)
 Central Michigan University (1967–Present)
 (Original Psi Psi) University of Michigan (1874-1875) (1877-2003) (2009–Present)
 Alma College (1984–Present)

Minnesota
 University of Minnesota, Twin Cities (1888–Present)
 University of St. Thomas (1990–Present)
 Minnesota State University, Mankato (2004–Present)

Mississippi
 University of Mississippi (1857-1912), (1926–Present)
 Mississippi College (1873-1874)
 Mississippi State University  (1938–Present)
 The University of Southern Mississippi (1981–Present)

Missouri
 Westminster College, Missouri (1949–2015)
 Southeast Missouri State University (1960–Present)
 Missouri State University (1971-2006) (2014–Present)
 Missouri University of Science and Technology (1983–Present)
 St. Louis University (1984-2011) (2017–Present)
 University of Missouri (1896-2002) (2007–2019)
 Washington University in St. Louis (1903–Present)

Montana
 University of Montana (1906–Present)
 Montana State University (1917–Present)

Nebraska
 University of Nebraska, Lincoln (1883–2008) (2011-2013) (2014-Present)

Nevada
 University of Nevada, Las Vegas (1969-2008)

New Hampshire
 Dartmouth College (1892-1960)
 University of New Hampshire (2013–present)

New Jersey
 Princeton University (1869-1870) (1875-1882) (2010–Present)
 Stevens Institute of Technology (1883-1891)
 Fairleigh Dickinson University (1988–Present)
 Rutgers University (1991–2017)

New Mexico
 University of New Mexico (1916-2002) (2008–Present)
 Eastern New Mexico University (1967–2016)
 New Mexico State University (1968-1985),(2008–Present)

New York
 Hobart College (1892–2007), (2015–Present)
 Cornell University (1890–Present)
 Union College (1923–Present)
 Colgate University (1930–2014)
 University of Rochester (1932–Present)
 Rensselaer Polytechnic Institute (1950–Present)
 St. Lawrence University (1953-1997)
 State University of New York at Albany (1988-2004)
 Clarkson University (1988–Present)
 State University of New York at Oswego (1994-2004)
 Columbia University (1894-1964) (1984–Present)
 Syracuse University (1904-1957) (1963-1998) (2008–Present)
 Rochester Institute of Technology (2011–Present)
 State University of New York at Binghamton (2017–Present)

North Carolina
 University of North Carolina at Chapel Hill (1889-1900) (1913–Present)
 University of North Carolina at Charlotte (2015–Present)
 University of North Carolina at Wilmington (2021–Present)
 Duke University (1912–Present)
 North Carolina State University (1943–Present)
 Davidson College (1948-1969)
 Wake Forest University (1948–Present)
 Elon University (1987–Present)
 Western Carolina University (1991–Present)

North Dakota
 University of North Dakota (1909–Present)
 North Dakota State University (1934–Present)

Ohio
 Miami University (1855-1858) (1892–2012) (2017 - Present)
 College of Wooster (1873-1893) (1899-1914) 
 Ohio Wesleyan University (1855-1884) (1888–2015)
 Denison University (1868-1876) (1880-2000) (2004–Present)
 Ohio State University (1882–Present)
 Western Reserve University (1963-1970)
 Case Western Reserve University— (Merged with  Western Reserve University in 1967) (1909-1972) (1973–Present)
 Bowling Green State University (1947-2004) (2016–Present)
 Ohio University (1949-2003), (2016–Present)
 Kent State University (1965–Present)
 University of Cincinnati (1882–Present) 
 Youngstown State University (1977–Present)
 University of Dayton (1988–2013)

Oklahoma
 University of Oklahoma (1912-2004) (2007–Present)
 Oklahoma State University (1922–Present)
 University of Tulsa (1951–Present)

Oregon
 University of Oregon (1910-1996), (2000–Present)
 Oregon State University (1916–Present)
 Willamette University (1947–Present)

Pennsylvania
 Gettysburg College (1863-2005), (2009–Present)
 Jefferson College (1858-1869)
 Bucknell University (1864–Present)
 (Original Nu) Washington College (1859-1863)
 Dickinson College (1859–Present)
 Polytechnic College of Philadelphia (1865-1876)
 Lafayette College (1867-1887), (1899-1966), (1982-1997)

 Lehigh University (1887-1891), (1893-1989), (1993–2017)
 Pennsylvania State University (1891–Present)
 University of Pittsburgh (1909–Present)
 Indiana University of Pennsylvania (1973–Present)
 Clarion University of Pennsylvania (1978-2003), (2015–Present)
 Villanova University (2005–Present)
 University of Pennsylvania (1875-1878), (1884–Present)
 Carnegie Mellon University (2012–Present)
 Saint Francis University (2012–Present)
MH West Chester University (2019–Present)

Rhode Island
 Brown University (1914-1965), (1973–2019)
 University of Rhode Island (1949-1996) (2011–Present)
 Bryant University  (2010–Present)

South Carolina
 Clemson University (1977–2018) 
 (Original Pi) Erskine College (1860-1861)
 University of South Carolina (1929–2016) (2019–Present)
 College of Charleston (1988–Present)
 Furman University (1989–Present)

Tennessee
 (Original Epsilon) Western Military Institute (1856-1858)
 (Original Sigma) La Grange Synodical College (1860-1861)
 Vanderbilt University (1891-1991), (1996–2022)
 University of Tennessee at Knoxville (1917–2017) (2021–Present)
 University of Tennessee at Chattanooga (1947–Present)
 University of Tennessee at Martin  (2007–Present)
 University of Memphis (1954–Present)
 East Tennessee State University (1969–Present)
 Middle Tennessee State University (1970–Present)
 Tennessee Technological University (1970–Present)
 Austin Peay State University (1973–Present)
 Cumberland University (1872-1880) (2011–Present)

Texas
 University of Texas at Austin (1884-1888), (1889-2004), (2009–Present)
 Southern Methodist University (1948–Present)
 Texas Christian University (1955–Present)
 Texas Tech University (1955-2012), (2019–Present)
 University of Houston (1956–2015)
 Lamar University (1961-1983)
 Sam Houston State University (1961–Present)
 Texas A&M University–Commerce (1963–Present)
 Texas A&M University-Kingsville (1967–Present)
 Stephen F. Austin State University (1975–Present)
 Texas A&M University (1976–Present)
 Baylor University (1978-2010), (2016–Present)
 University of Texas at Arlington (1984–2019)
 Texas State University (1986-1999), (2009–Present)
 University of North Texas (1990–Present)
 Tarleton State University (1996–Present)

Utah
 University of Utah (1908–Present)
 Utah State University (1926–Present)
 Southern Utah University (1993–Present)

Virginia
 Washington and Lee University (1866–Present)
 Roanoke College (1872-1890), (1895-1902), (1923–Present)
 University of Virginia, originally  chapter (1860-1861), (1866–Present)
 (Original Alpha Beta) Richmond College (1880-1882)
 Virginia Military Institute (1884-1885)
 Randolph-Macon College (1874-1901)
 University of Richmond (1958-2019)
 College of William and Mary (1968–Present)
 Virginia Polytechnic Institute and State University (1971–2018)
 James Madison University (1987–2015)
 George Mason University (1989–Present) 
 Radford University (1992–Present)
 Hampden-Sydney College (1872-1889) (1890-1902) (1931-1977) (1983–Present)
 Virginia Commonwealth University (2017–Present)

Washington
 Washington State University (1919–Present)
 Whitman College (1923-1967) (1970–Present)
 University of Puget Sound (1950–Present)
 University of Washington  (1903–Present)

West Virginia
 West Virginia University (1895–Present)

Wisconsin
 Beloit College (1882–Present)
 University of Wisconsin–Madison (1884–2020)
 Ripon College (Wisconsin) (1955–Present)
 Marquette University (1989–Present)
  University of Wisconsin–Milwaukee (2014–Present)

Wyoming
 University of Wyoming (1930–Present)

Undergraduate Chapters in Canada

British Columbia
 University of British Columbia - Simon Fraser University (1949–Present)

Nova Scotia
 Dalhousie University-St. Mary's University (1933–Present)

Ontario
 University of Toronto and Ryerson University (now Toronto Metropolitan University) (1922–Present)
 University of Western Ontario (1957–Present)
 University of Waterloo (1987–Present)
 Wilfrid Laurier University (1989–Present)
 University of Windsor (1994–Present)
 University of Ottawa (2010–Present)
 Brock University (2018–Present)

Quebec
 McGill University (1927–Present)
 Bishop's University (1990–2014)

References 

 The Norman Shield. United States of America: Sigma Chi Fraternity, 2006. 73-77 The 2006-2007 Norman Shield
 "Directory." The Magazine of Sigma Chi Winter 2006-2007: 144-156
 "List of Undergraduate Chapters." Sigma Chi Fraternity, 2017. (http://members.sigmachi.org/Shared_Content/Custom/Fraternity/Undergraduate_Services/Chapter_Support/Current_Chapters.aspx)

Lists of chapters of United States student societies by society
chapters